Hardware Freedom Day is an annual celebration organized by the Digital Freedom Foundation. The goal of Hardware Freedom Day is to celebrate the spirit of open hardware and make more people aware of using and contributing to free and hardware projects. The first Hardware Freedom Day was held on April 20, 2013. The 2022 date is 4/16.

Goals 
 To spread awareness about free and open hardware
 To encourage user contribution
 To provide a common platform for people passionate about open hardware to share their ideas and interests

Schedule 
Anybody can organize a Hardware Freedom Day event and there is no rigid schedule followed. Digital Freedom Foundation co-ordinates the event at a global level, providing support, giveaways and a centralized collaboration space. However, volunteer teams around the world organize the events by themselves.

Some common activities of Hardware Freedom Day events are
 Workshops on various kinds of open hardware
 Open hacking competitions
 Demonstrations of projects
 Introduction of new projects
 Talks

Open hardware 
In the context of Hardware Freedom Day, the term open hardware encompasses physical devices whose design can be
shared in public without restriction and freely modified and re-distributed.

The design includes all information that a person would need to re-create the device.

2015-2016 issues 
The Digital Freedom Foundation servers were hacked over Christmas 2015 (posted on their mailing list) and have struggled to come back up. HFD 2016 is planned for April 9, 2016 but no registration is available which will make this year celebration hard to follow.

See also 
 Document Freedom Day
 Software Freedom Day
 Culture Freedom Day
 Public Domain Day
 The Defective by Design campaign holds International Day Against DRM

References

External links 
 Official website
 Official website of a different event with the same name, held in January

Open-source hardware
April observances
Recurring events established in 2013
Intellectual property activism
Unofficial observances
International observances